= Charles Netterstrom =

American businessman and politician

Charles M. Netterstrom was a businessman and politician in Chicago, Illinois. His 1871 home, built after the Great Chicago Fire, is extant. He served in the Illinois Senate.

He was a Republican. He represented Cook County in the Illinois Senate.

== See also ==
- List of Chicago Landmarks
